Conor Travers is a former contestant from the British television game show Countdown. In May 2006 he became a series champion at the age of 14 years, and remains the show's youngest ever champion. He later qualified for the 12th Championship of Champions tournament, making the semi-final in the process. He also won the Countdown 30th Birthday Championship in March 2013, where in the final he scored a then-record equalling 146 points.

Travers studied for his GCSEs at Cardinal Newman Catholic School, Luton and he did his A-levels at Luton Sixth Form College. He went on to study mathematics at St John’s College, University of Cambridge. His hobbies include cricket, chess, and computers.

References

Contestants on British game shows
Countdown (game show)
Living people
People from Luton
Alumni of St John's College, Cambridge
Year of birth missing (living people)